Team Phoenix is a Burmese football club, founded in 2017. This is the first time MNL-2 season of Team Phoenix FC.

Current squad

References

External links
 First Eleven Journal in Burmese
 Soccer Myanmar in Burmese

Association football clubs established in 2009
Myanmar National League clubs
2009 establishments in Myanmar
Football clubs in Myanmar